Gregorius Van Hoorde was an 18th-century Dominican hagiographer from Ghent in the Austrian Netherlands (now Belgium). He was the author of a life of Thomas Aquinas.

Works
 Leven van den heyligen en engelschen leeraer Thomas van Aquinen (Ghent, Augustinus Graet, 1718).

References

Date of birth unknown
Date of death unknown
Writers from Ghent
Dominican scholars
Writers of the Austrian Netherlands